The APEV Pouchel Light is a French amateur-built aircraft, designed by Daniel Dalby and produced by APEV of Peynier. The aircraft is supplied as plans or as a kit for amateur construction.

Design and development
The Pouchel Light replaced the Pouchel II in production, which in turn replaced the original APEV Pouchel. The original Pouchel was constructed using three commercially available aluminium ladders, hence APEV is the Association pour la Promotion des Echelles Volantes, or in English, Association for the Promotion of Flying Ladders. Later models were forced to move to rectangular aluminium tubing when the ladder manufacturer grew concerned about liability.

The Pouchel series are all derivatives of the classic 1930s Henri Mignet-designed Mignet Pou-du-Ciel (Flying Flea).

The Pouchel Light features a cantilever rear wing with a strut-braced parasol front wing, a single-seat open cockpit without a windshield, fixed conventional landing gear and a single engine in tractor configuration. The aircraft is made from bolted-together aluminum tubing. The wings are the same as those used on the Scoutchel and are built around a single aluminium spar, with ribs made from extruded polystyrene with plywood bracing, all bonded to fibreglass leading and trailing edges, covered in Dacron sailcloth. Recommended engines are the  Rotax 377 or the  Rotax 447 two-stroke powerplants.

Specifications (Pouchel Light)

References

External links
Official website

Homebuilt aircraft
Single-engined tractor aircraft
Pouchel Light
Tandem-wing aircraft